Events in the year 1996 in Mexico.

Incumbents

Federal government
 President: Ernesto Zedillo
 Interior Secretary (SEGOB): Emilio Chuayffet.
 Secretary of Foreign Affairs (SRE): José Ángel Gurría
 Communications Secretary (SCT): Carlos Ruiz Sacristán
 Secretary of Defense (SEDENA): Enrique Cervantes Aguirre
 Secretary of Navy: José Ramón Lorenzo Franco
 Secretary of Labor and Social Welfare: José Antonio González Fernández
 Secretary of Welfare: Carlos Rojas Gutiérrez
 Secretary of Public Education: Miguel Limón Rojas
 Tourism Secretary (SECTUR): Óscar Espinosa Villarreal
 Secretary of the Environment (SEMARNAT): Julia Carabias Lillo
 Secretary of Health (SALUD): Juan Ramón de la Fuente

Supreme Court

 President of the Supreme Court: José Vicente Aguinaco Alemán

Governors

 Aguascalientes: Otto Granados Roldán, (Institutional Revolutionary Party, PRI)
 Baja California: Héctor Terán Terán, (National Action Party PAN).
 Baja California Sur: Guillermo Mercado Romero
 Campeche: Jorge Salomón Azar García
 Chiapas: Julio César Ruíz Ferro
 Chihuahua: Francisco Barrio
 Coahuila: Rogelio Montemayor Seguy
 Colima: Carlos de la Madrid Virgen
 Durango: Maximiliano Silerio Esparza 
 Guanajuato: Vicente Fox Quesada
 Guerrero: Rubén Figueroa Alcocer/Ángel Aguirre Rivero
 Hidalgo: Jesús Murillo Karam
 Jalisco: Alberto Cárdenas Jiménez
 State of Mexico: César Camacho Quiroz
 Michoacán: Víctor Manuel Tinoco/Ausencio Chávez Hernández
 Morelos: Jorge Carrillo Olea (PRI).
 Nayarit: Rigoberto Ochoa Zaragoza
 Nuevo León: Benjamín Clariond
 Oaxaca: Diódoro Carrasco Altamirano
 Puebla: Manuel Bartlett Díaz
 Querétaro: Enrique Burgos García
 Quintana Roo: Mario Villanueva Madrid
 San Luis Potosí: Horacio Sánchez Unzueta
 Sinaloa: Renato Vega Alvarado
 Sonora: Manlio Fabio Beltrones Rivera
 Tabasco: Roberto Madrazo Pintado
 Tamaulipas: Manuel Cavazos Lerma	
 Tlaxcala: José Antonio Álvarez Lima
 Veracruz: Patricio Chirinos Calero
 Yucatán: Víctor Cervera Pacheco
 Zacatecas: Arturo Romo Gutiérrez
Regent of Mexico City: Oscar Espinosa Villarreal

Events

 Universidad Metropolitana de Monterrey established. 
 Alternative rock group Plastilina Mosh is founded.
 February 16: the San Andres Accords were signed.
 June: The Guadalajara Gay Pride is founded. 
 June 28: The Popular Revolutionary Army announces its existence. 
 September 22: Nuestra Belleza México 1996 held in Cancun. 
 October 23: The Law of Protection of Commerce and Investments from Foreign Policies that Contravene International Law is published.

Awards
Belisario Domínguez Medal of Honor
Griselda Álvarez
Alí Chumacero
Ohtli Award
 Gonzalo Barrientos
 Hector P. Garcia
 Carlos Truan 
 Edward R. Roybal

Births
 January 30 : Dafne Navarro, trampoline gymnast
 August 12 : Julio Urías, baseball player

Deaths
May 24 – Octavio Sentíes Gómez, 81, politician (PRI), Governor of Veracruz, Secretary of the Interior, Regent of DF (b. February 9, 1915)

Hurricanes

 July 24 – August 6: Hurricane Cesar–Douglas
 August 19 – 26: Hurricane Dolly (1996) 
 September 30 – October 4: Hurricane Hernan

Sports

 1995–96 Mexican Primera División season 
 1995–96 Copa Mexico 
 Mexico wins the 1996 U.S. Cup 
 Mexico loses in the final of the Pan American Games football tournament 
 Mexico at the 1996 Summer Olympics 
 Mexico at the 1996 Summer Paralympics 
 Atlético Hidalgo, C.F. Cuautitlán and Real Sociedad de Zacatecas are founded.

References

External links

 
Mexico